The Cornell University Greek system dates to the first months of university operation during the autumn of 1868. Cornell's co-founder and first president, Andrew Dickson White was a strong promoter of fraternities as a means of teaching self-governance to young students. Among its leaders, other strong supporters of the Greek system were Presidents Edmund Ezra Day and Frank H.T. Rhodes.

Among general ("social") organizations, Cornell currently recognizes 28 Interfraternity Council fraternities, 13 Panhellenic Association sororities, and 11 Multicultural Greek & Fraternal Council fraternities and sororities.

Interfraternity Council

Fraternities constituting the Interfraternity Council (IFC) are listed by dates of local founding and noted with national conference membership. These are (with two exceptions) men's organizations, voluntarily coordinating their efforts within the IFC. As part of IFC or national organization self-governance or University disciplinary action, chapters may be suspended ("de-recognized") or closed for a time. For consistency, if a chapter is closed and/or forfeits its housing, it will be listed here as a dormant chapter, italicized, while active chapters or those suspended for a brief time are in bold. See the Office of Student Life for current recognized IFC members.

Active chapters

  - Zeta Psi, 1868 (NIC) 
  - Chi Phi, 1868-1881, 1888 (NIC) 
  - Alpha Delta Phi, 1869 (NIC) 
  - Chi Psi, 1869-1875, 1885-2014, 2016 (NIC) 
  - Delta Upsilon, 1869-2002, 2004 (NIC) 
  - Delta Phi, 1891-2018, 2022 (NIC) 
  - Delta Kappa Epsilon, 1870-2013, 2017 (NIC) 
  - Theta Delta Chi, 1870-1999, 2003 (NIC) 
  - Phi Delta Theta, 1872-1876, 1886-1970, 1973 
  - Beta Theta Pi, 1879 (NIC) 
  - Phi Sigma Kappa, 1889 (NIC) 

  - Delta Chi, 1890-2003, 2007 (NIC) 
  - Delta Tau Delta, 1890 (NIC) 
  - Sigma Chi, 1890 (NIC) 
  - Sigma Phi, 1890 (NIC) 
  - Sigma Alpha Epsilon, 1891-1895, 1898-2011, 2022 (NIC) 
  - Kappa Sigma, 1892-2010, 2012 
  - Alpha Zeta, 1901 (PFA), co-ed 
  - Sigma Nu (colony), 1901-2018, 2021 (NIC)  
 Seal and Serpent, 1905 local, co-ed (non-IFC) 
 Acacia, 1907 (NIC) 
  - Zeta Beta Tau, 1907-1982, 1989-2013, 2014 (NIC) 

  - Alpha Sigma Phi, 1909 (NIC) 
  - Kappa Delta Rho, 1913-1943, 1950 (NIC) 
  - Lambda Chi Alpha, 1913 
  - Alpha Gamma Rho, 1914 (NIC & PFA) 
  - Alpha Epsilon Pi, 1917-1976, 1978-2001?, 2005 (NIC) 
  - Pi Kappa Alpha, 1917-2010, 2013 (NIC) 
  - Sigma Pi, 1917 (NIC) 
  - Pi Kappa Phi, 1921-1937, 1949-1986, 1990-2001, 2002 (NIC) 
  - Phi Kappa Tau, 1930-1994, 2000 (NIC) 

Chapters whose names changed

 Irving Society - 1868-1869, evolved into  
  - Alpha Sigma Chi, 1871-1879, absorbed into  
  - Epsilon Kappa Pi (local), 188x–1888, became  
 Skull - 1901-1918, became  
 Bandhu - 1902–1918, became  
  - Theta Lambda Phi, 1903-1912, became  
 Zodiac - 1904–1936, absorbed into  after a failed absorption by Beta Kappa 
 Cerberus - 1904-1911, became ΦΚΣ 
 Cayuga Club - 1905-1910, became  (see ) 
  - Omega Pi Alpha, 1905-1907, see Nayati (local) 
  - Kappa Psi, 1907-1923, local, became  
 Nayati - 1907-1919, local, became  
 Obelisk - 1907-1910, local, see  
  Phi Delta Sigma, 1908–1930, became  
 ISWZA - 1908–1913, local, became  
 Arts and Science Club - 1908-1922, became  
 Amphia - 1909-1912, became ΘΧ 
  - Beta Sigma (local), 1910–1911, Jewish, became  
  - , 1910–1920, Jewish, became  
  - Sigma Phi Sigma, 1910-1941, see  
  - Phi Epsilon Pi, 1911–1970, became  
 Cadeucus - 1911-1914, local, became  
 Eleusis, 1912-1931, local, became ΘΚΝ, (see ).
  - Alpha Theta, 1912-1917, local, became  
  - Omicron Alpha Tau, 1912–1934, Jewish, merged with  
  - Phi Sigma Delta, 1912-1970, became  
  - Phi Beta Delta, 1912-1918, 1934-1941, Jewish, see ΠΛΦ 

  - Omega Delta, 1913-1917, local, became  
  - Omicron Sigma Omicron, 1914-1915, local, became , (see ) 
  - Theta Alpha, 1915-1933, see ΔΣΛ 
  - Phi Tau, 1915-1916 (local), Jewish, became  
 Komos Club - 1916-1921, became  
  - Beta Sigma Rho, 1920–1972, Jewish, merged with  
 Scorpion Club - 1923-1940, became  
  - Phi Delta Mu, 1925-1934, Jewish, see  
  - Beta Psi, 1926-1935, dormant, see  
  - Sigma Omega Psi, ~1927-1934?, Jewish, see  
  - Theta Kappa Phi, 1927-1931, became ΦΚΘ 
  - Theta Kappa Nu, 1931–1939 (NIC), merged into  
  - Beta Kappa, 1934-1936 (NIC), see ΘΧ 
 Cornell Engineering Men - pre-1942, local, became Triangle 
  - Kappa Nu, 1951-1963, Jewish, see  
  - Phi Alpha, 1953-1959, Jewish, merged into  (see ) 
  - Phi Delta Alpha, 1970-1973, see  

Dormant chapters
  - Kappa Alpha Society, 1868-1990, 2007-2018 (NIC), dormant 
  - Alpha Omega, 1868-1870, local, dormant 
  - Phi Kappa Psi, 1869-1877, 1885-2020 (NIC), dormant 
  - Sigma Delta Pi, 1871-1874, dormant 
  - Psi Upsilon, 1876-2016 (NIC), dormant 
  - Theta Nu Epsilon, 1877-1913, dormant 

  - Delta Beta Phi, 1878-1882, dormant 
  - Alpha Tau Omega, 1887-2013 (NIC), dormant 
 Q.T.V. - 1888-1889, dormant 
  - Phi Gamma Delta (FIJI), 1888-1989, 1993-2020 (NIC), dormant 
  - Pi Lambda Phi, 1896-1901, 1911-1976 (NIC), dormant 
  - Theta Xi, 1903-1970, 2008-2010, (NIC), dormant 
  - Delta Sigma Phi, 1907-1943 (NIC), dormant 
  - Alpha Chi Rho, 1908-1971, 1976-1980, 1992-199x (NIC), dormant 
  - Sigma Alpha Mu, 1911-1912, 1915-1973, 1985-2021 (NIC), dormant 
 Huntington Club - 1911-1922+, local, Episcopal affinity, dormant 
  - Phi Kappa Sigma, 1911-1991 (NIC), dormant 
  - Theta Chi, 1912-1983, 1985-1999 (NIC), dormant 
  - Sigma Phi Epsilon, 1912-2005, 2006-2019 (NIC), dormant 
  - Tau Epsilon Phi, 1913-1932, 1939-2012 (NIC), dormant 
 Philos Club - 1914-1917, local, dormant 
  - Sigma Upsilon, 1915-1933, local, dormant 
  - Phi Delta Pi, 1916-1926, Jewish, dormant 
  - Alpha Phi Delta, 1922-1968, 2012-2018 (NIC), dormant 
  - Tau Kappa Epsilon, 1923-1934, 1940-2012, 2018-2020, dormant 
  - Phi Kappa Theta, 1927-1931 (NIC), dormant 
  - Delta Sigma Lambda, 1933-1936 (DeMolay affiliated), dormant 
  - Tau Delta Phi, 1934-1971 (NIC), Jewish, dormant 
 Triangle, 1942-1985 (NIC), dormant 
  - Alpha Gamma Sigma, 1972-199x (NIC), dormant, agricultural focus 
  - Sigma Chi Delta, 1981-2020 co-ed local, dormant 
  - Alpha Lambda Mu, 2014-2020, dormant

Panhellenic Council

Sororities constituting the Panhellenic Council (PHC) are listed with dates of local founding and national conference membership, these are women's organizations, voluntarily coordinating their efforts within the PHC. As part of PHC or national organization self-governance, or University disciplinary action, chapters may be suspended ("de-recognized") or closed for a time. If a chapter is closed and/or forfeits its housing, it will be listed as a dormant chapter. Active groups in bold, dormant groups in italics. See the Office of Student Life for current PHA members.

NPC indicates members of the National Panhellenic Conference.

Active chapters

  - Kappa Alpha Theta, 1881-1965, 1980 (NPC)
  - Kappa Kappa Gamma, 1883-1969, 1977 (NPC)
  - Delta Gamma, 1885 (NPC)
  - Alpha Phi, 1889, reorganized 1998 (NPC)
  - Pi Beta Phi, 1892-1893, 1919 (NPC)
  - Delta Delta Delta, 1913 (NPC)
  - Kappa Delta, 1917-1969, 1975 (NPC)
  - Sigma Delta Tau, 1917 (NPC)
  - Alpha Xi Delta, 1918-1964, 2005 (NPC)
  - Alpha Epsilon Phi, 1920-1971, 197x (NPC)
  - Phi Sigma Sigma, 1954-1969, 2011 (NPC)
  - Alpha Chi Omega, 1984 (NPC)

Chapters whose names changed
  - Kappa Alpha Theta, 1881-1965 (NPC), disaffiliated, became the Prospect of Whitby cooperative 
 Sennightly - 1895-1913, became  
  - Omega Chi, 1916-1917, local, became  
  - Phi Kappa, 1916-1917, local, became  
  - Delta Pi Alpha, 1916-1918, local, became  
  - Sigma Delta Phi, 1917-1919, local, became  
  - Chi Gamma, 1920-1921, 1956-1964, local, became  
  - Sigma Kappa, 1921-1956 (NPC), reverted to local  
  - Kappa Kappa Psi, 1969-1977, local, restored as  

Dormant chapters
  - Alpha Omicron Pi, 1908-1962, 1989-2008 (NPC), dormant 
  - Delta Zeta, 1908-1932 (NPC), dormant 
  - Chi Omega, 1917-1963, 1987-2003 (NPC), dormant 
  - Delta Phi Epsilon, 1960-1988, 1994-2003 (NPC), dormant 
  - Iota Alpha Pi, 1966-1967 (NPC), disbanded nationally 1971 
  - Alpha Gamma Delta, 1985-1996 (NPC), dormant 
  - Phi Mu, 2014-2021 (NPC), dormant

Multicultural Greek & Fraternal Council
Sororities and Fraternities constituting the Multicultural Greek and Fraternal Council (MGFC) were originally affiliated with specific ethnicities or languages. Most of these organizations are now fully integrated as are the rest of Cornell's Greek letter organizations. All MGFC chapters are. Listed with dates of local founding and national conference membership, these are men's and women's organizations that voluntarily coordinate their efforts within the MGFC. As part of MGFC or University self-governance during disciplinary action, chapters may be suspended ("de-recognized") for a time. Unless the suspensions result in long-term closure of the chapter or forfeiture of a building, they should not be removed from this list. Active groups in bold, dormant groups in italics. See the Office of Student Life for current MGFC members. The inter-Greek councils often cooperate on programs and policies, as do individual chapters from among the several Greek councils.

Men's

  - Alpha Phi Alpha, 1906 (NPHC, NIC)
  - Kappa Alpha Psi, 1978 (NPHC, NIC)
  - Phi Beta Sigma, 1979 (NPHC, formerly NIC)
  - Lambda Upsilon Lambda, 1982 (NALFO)
  - Pi Delta Psi, 1998 (NAPA)
  - Lambda Phi Epsilon, 1999 (NAPA, NIC)
  - MALIK (fraternity), 2015

Women's

  - Delta Sigma Theta, 1975 (NPHC)|
  - Lambda Pi Chi, 1988 (NALFO)
  - Sigma Gamma Rho, 1990 (NPHC)
  - Sigma Lambda Upsilon, 1993 (NALFO)
  - alpha Kappa Delta Phi, 1997 (NAPA) 
  - Kappa Phi Lambda, 2000 (NAPA)
  - Zeta Phi Beta, 2019 (NPHC)

Chapters whose names changed
 Su Ye She, 1916-1917, Chinese men's group, see Rho Psi
 Club Hispania, 1929-1931, local Hispanic men's group, see Phi Lambda Alpha
  - Phi Lambda Alpha, 1931-1931, Hispanic men's group, see Phi Iota Alpha 

Dormant chapters
  - Alpha Zeta, 1890-1894, Hispanic men's group. 
  - Rho Psi, 1917-1931, Chinese men's group, no longer active at the collegiate level. 
  - Phi Iota Alpha, 1931-1940? (NALFO, NIC), men's group 
  - Alpha Kappa Alpha, 1937-1940, 1952-2018 (NPHC), women's group, dormant.
  - Omega Psi Phi, 1982-2019, (NPHC), men's group, dormant
  - Lambda Theta Phi, 1995-20xx (NALFO, NIC), men's group, dormant.
  - Omega Phi Beta, 1999-20xx (NALFO), women's group, dormant.
  - Phi Theta Chi, 199x-20xx?, Latina, women's group 
  - Chi Upsilon Sigma, 2003-20xx (NALFO), women's group, dormant.
  - Lambda Theta Alpha, 2004-20xx (NALFO), women's group, dormant.
  - Iota Phi Theta, 2005-20xx (NPHC, NIC), men's group, dormant.

Honor, professional, and service societies
These organizations have a similarly long pedigree on the Cornell campus, but are largely non-residential.  Members of the social and academic fraternities and sororities may join or be asked to join, as may non-Greek students.  Multiple affiliations are allowable.  The cut-off line where any campus organization falls within these headings or without is somewhat arbitrary; those formed prior to 1990 are listed under these subheadings in various volumes of the Baird's Manual of American College Fraternities, which for more than a century has been the data source of record for such organizations.  Newer groups have been placed in categories which match Baird's categories. The latest, 1991 version of Bairds was published before the national development of some of the societies here, and therefore, position and inclusion is, in some cases, assumptive.

Honor and recognition societies
Honor societies recognize students who excel academically or as leaders among their peers, often within a specific academic discipline. Many honor societies invite students to become members based on scholastic rank (the top x% of a class) and/or grade point, either overall, or for classes taken within the discipline for which the honor society provides recognition. In cases where academic achievement would not be an appropriate criterion for membership, other standards are usually required for membership (such as completion of a particular ceremony or training program). These societies recognize past achievement. Pledging is not required, and new candidates may be immediately inducted into membership after meeting predetermined academic criteria and paying a one-time membership fee. Because of their purpose of recognition, most honor societies will have much higher academic achievement requirements for membership than professional societies. It is also common for a scholastic honor society to add a criterion relating to the character of the student. Some honor societies are invitation only while others allow unsolicited applications. Finally, membership in an honor society might be considered exclusive, i.e., a member of such an organization cannot join other honor societies representing the same field. Governance varies from faculty-guided to purely student run.

Listed by date of local founding with national conference membership, these are co-ed, non-residential, achievement-based organizations that self-select members based on published criteria.

ACHS indicates members of the Association of College Honor Societies.

Active chapters

  - Phi Beta Kappa, 1882, academic honors
  - Sigma Xi, 1886, graduate science & engineering honors
  - Phi Delta Phi, 1888, law honors
 Sphinx Head Society, 1890, local, character, leadership and service
 Der Hexenkreis, 1892, local, character, leadership and service 
 Quill and Dagger, 1893, local, character, leadership and service
 Scabbard and Blade, 1906 (ACHS), military
  - Alpha Omega Alpha, 1910, graduate medical honors
  - Tau Beta Pi, 1910 (ACHS), engineering honors
  - Eta Kappa Nu, 1912, electrical engineering, computer engineering honors
 Order of the Coif, 1914, law school graduates honors
  - Kappa Omicron Nu, 1919 (ACHS), humanities honors
 Ye Hosts, 1926, local, hotel administration honors, service
  - Pi Alpha Xi, 1923, horticulture honors
  - Alpha Kappa Delta, 1925 (ACHS), sociology honors
  - Phi Zeta, 1925, graduate veterinary medicine honors
  - Chi Epsilon, 1925 (ACHS), civil engineering honors
  - Delta Phi Alpha, 1933, German honors
  - Pi Delta Phi, 1936 (ACHS), French honors
 Block and Bridle, 1937, animal livestock honors
  - Alpha Epsilon Delta, 1946 (ACHS), pre-health honors
  - Pi Tau Sigma, 1948 (ACHS), mechanical engineering honors
  - Psi Chi, 1948 (ACHS), psychology honors
  - Pi Mu Epsilon, 1953, mathematics honors
  - Phi Tau Sigma, 1957, food science and technology honors
  - Omicron Delta Epsilon, 1961 (ACHS), economics honors
  - Sigma Theta Tau, 1968 (ACHS), nursing honors
  - Sigma Delta Pi, 1975 (ACHS), Spanish and Portuguese honors
 Order of Omega, 1979, Greek society leadership honors
 Golden Key International Honour Society, 1989, high achievement in academics, leadership & service
  - Phi Sigma Pi, 1994, scholastic and leadership honors
  - Omega Rho, 1995 (ACHS), operations research, management science honors
  - Alpha Epsilon, 1998 (ACHS), agricultural, food, and biological engineering honors
 NSCS - National Society of Collegiate Scholars, 1999 (ACHS), high achievement
  - Lambda Pi Eta, 2001 (ACHS), communications honors
  - Pi Sigma Alpha. 2003 (ACHS), political science honors
  - Beta Gamma Sigma, 2004 (ACHS), business academic honors
  - Pi Alpha Alpha, 2006 (ACHS), public administration honors
 Red Key Society, 2007, local, Athletics and community-building honors
 NRHH - National Residence Hall Honorary, 2007, residence hall leadership honors
  - Delta Alpha Pi, 2012, high achievement with disabilities
 Irving Literary Society, 1868-1887, restarted 2014, local, literary honors
 AAS - Arnold Air Society, 19xx, Air Force cadet honors

Chapters whose names changed
 Mortar Board, 1918-2021, senior class scholarship, leadership and service honors, (see Der Hexenkreis) 

Dormant chapters
 Chancery, 1890-1980 ?, senior law honors, dormant. 
 Aleph Samach, 1893-1983+, junior class men's honors, dormant. 
 Raven and Serpent, <1896-1983+, junior class women's honors, dormant. 
  - Delta Sigma Rho-Tau Kappa Alpha, 1911-1999 ?, forensics honor, dormant? 

  - Phi Kappa Phi, 1920-1979, 1983-2013, honors, all disciplines, dormant 
  - Sigma Gamma Epsilon, 1921-1965, earth sciences honors, dormant 
  - National Collegiate Players or Pi Epsilon Delta, 1960-19xx, theater honors, national disbanded 
  - Alpha Lambda Delta, 1961-1986, (ACHS) freshmen honors, dormant 
  - Phi Eta Sigma, 1961-1973, freshman honors, dormant 
  - Alpha Pi Mu, 1968-1972 (ACHS), industrial engineering honors, dormant 
  - Pi Sigma Alpha. 2003-20xx (ACHS), political science honors, dormant?

Professional societies
Professional societies work to build friendship bonds among members, cultivate their strengths that they may promote their profession, and provide mutual assistance in their shared areas of professional study.

Listed by date of local founding with national conference membership, these are primarily co-ed and non-residential organizations, of an array of professional interests.  Membership in a professional fraternity may be the result of a pledge process, much like a social fraternity, and members are expected to remain loyal and active in the organization for life. Within the group of societies dedicated to a professional field of study, for example, law societies, membership is exclusive; however, these societies may initiate members who belong to other types of fraternities. Professional Societies are known for networking and post-collegiate involvement. Governance varies from faculty-managed to purely student run.

PFA indicates members of the Professional Fraternity Association

Active chapters

  - Gamma Alpha, 1899 biological science graduate students (co-op)
  - Phi Delta Epsilon, 1904 (PFA), medical
  - Alpha Psi, 1907, veterinary medicine, (residential)
  - Omega Tau Sigma, 1911 (PFA), veterinary (residential)
  - Alpha Chi Sigma, 1913 (PFA), chemistry (residential)
  - Sigma Delta Epsilon or GWIS, 1921, graduate women in science
  - Phi Alpha Delta, 1925 (PFA), pre-law 
  - Phi Sigma Pi, 1994 (PFA), leadership and scholarship
  - Alpha Kappa Psi, 1998 (PFA), business
  - Sigma Alpha, 2002 (PFA), women's, agriculture
  - Delta Sigma Pi, 2004 (PFA), business
  - Phi Gamma Nu, 2008 (PFA), business
  - Pi Lambda Sigma, 2017, government 
  - Pi Sigma Epsilon, 2011 (PFA), sales and marketing
  - Kappa Alpha Pi, 2011, pre-law
  - Theta Tau, 2012 (PFA), engineering
  - Phi Chi Theta, 2017 (PFA), business
  - Phi Beta Lambda-FBLA, 19xx, business

Dormant chapters

  - Nu Sigma Nu, 1900-19xx, medical professional, national disbanded 
  - Alpha Kappa Kappa, 1901-1941, medical professional, national disbanded 
  - Alpha Epsilon Iota, 1901-1913, medical professional, national disbanded 
  - Delta Theta Phi, 1903-1953 (PFA), law, dormant 
  - Gamma Eta Gamma, 1909-1918, law, dormant 
  - Sigma Delta Chi, 1920-1959, [now SPJ] journalism, dormant 

  - Phi Chi, 1921-1956, medical, dormant 
  - Kappa Beta Pi, 1921-1939 (PFA), was women's legal, dormant 
  - Phi Lambda Kappa, 1928-1947?, medical, dormant 
  - Kappa Delta Epsilon, 1933-1960 (PFA), education, dormant 
  - Kappa Phi Kappa, 1934-1956, education, dormant 
  - Phi Delta Gamma, 1940-1953, women graduate students, dormant

Service societies
Service societies are listed with dates of local founding and national conference membership, if any; these are non-residential, co-ed organizations designed to provide campus and community service. These organizations are self-governed.

  - Alpha Phi Omega, 1927 (PFA), service
 Greeks Go Green, 20xx, local, environmentalism

Building and property ownership

Cornell University Residence Plan of 1966

During AY 1948-1949, Cornell University President Edmund Ezra Day formally distanced the University leadership from the increased discrimination which he observed at Cornell since 1910.  His speech at the time marked the beginning an effort to end such unlawful practices, a goal to which the University remains committed. Following hearings into discrimination within Cornell's system of private fraternities and sororities, fifteen fraternities liquidated private holdings and entered into the Cornell University Residence Plan of 1966, or CURP'66, an agreement which required all signatories to refrain from unlawful discrimination. The majority of CURP ’66 houses are on the Cornell West Campus. The Plan created a system of 'living and learning' by Small Residence.

Each Group House was to be maintained by a Priority Group electing its Group Sponsor.  Phi Kappa Psi, for instance, sponsored Group House No. IV d/b/a/ The Irving Literary Society, and developed its parcel on Cornell's West Campus.  Cornell desired an academic atmosphere in student residence “units” providing appropriate facilities for intellectual and cultural activities and by encouraging student participation in these pursuits. CURP ’66 was not simply the creation of University-owned fraternities and sororities, but a plan to provide a supplement to the University-maintained dormitory complex, the existing Cornell Greek System, off-campus apartments and rooming houses.  The vision was to organize “Small Residences” together, regardless of their national or local orientation as fraternities or cooperatives. The University program provided for no discrimination on the basis of race, creed, color or national origin.  The issue of gender was addressed in the equal promotion of female, male and gender neutral Group Houses. In 1997, Cornell's president, Hunter Rawlings, reaffirmed the Board of Trustees' commitment to the Cornell University Residence Plan of 1966.

The current CURP ’66 was created from an existing University leasing system dating to the 1881 decision by Andrew Dickson White to favor fraternities over dormitories.  White thought fraternities “’[would] arouse in the students a feeling of responsibility both for the care of the property and for the reputation of the house . . . [and] fastens upon [students’] duties and responsibilities similar to those of men in the active world was among the better solutions of the problems [of] . . . students in American universities.’”  White’s vision, in turn, develop from the professional analysis of American architect and planner, Frederick Law Olmsted, who saw the erection of residential clubhouses on Morrill Land-Grant Colleges Act as a reform over the barracks-like dormitories used by existing American universities and colleges.  Like White, Olmsted felt clubhouses maintained by the students would form part of the educational experience. They were to be modeled on the typical rural household of the era, small country villas thought to avoid the negative aspects of the Industrial revolution.

CURP signatories
 Group House No. I, possessed by Delta Kappa Epsilon, signatory since 1960, 13 South Avenue (in residence); 
 Group House No. II, possessed by Delta Tau Delta, signatory since June 8, 1960, 104 Mary Anne Wood Drive (in residence); 
 Group House No. III, Chi Phi ("Craigielea"), signatory since Nov. 15, 1960, 107 Edgemoor Lane (in residence); 
 Group House No. IV, "Ivy," possessed by Phi Kappa Psi ("The Gables"), signatory since Nov. 30, 1959, 525 Stewart Avenue, service deliveries to 120 Mary Anne Wood Drive; Phi Psi is also the successor organization to the Irving Literary Society. First to sign into the revised Group Housing Plan in 1959, it was fourth in accession due to negotiations over the sale of its property at 312 Thurston Avenue, the former Wyckoff Mansion (in residence); 
 Group House No. V, possessed by Sigma Phi Epsilon, signatory since 1962, 109 McGraw Place (in residence); 
 Group House No. VI, possessed by Delta Upsilon, signatory since 1962, 6 South Avenue (in residence); 
 Group House No. VII, occupied by Phi Sigma Sigma, and formerly possessed by Kappa Alpha, which was a signatory in 1991 (signing was delayed for three decades, for reasons unknown), 14 South Avenue; 
 Group House No. VIII, possessed by Zeta Psi, signatory since 1963, 534 Thurston Avenue, (in residence); 
 Group House No. IX, since been torn down, once occupied by Sigma Alpha Mu, and formerly possessed by Chi Omega, signatory since 1963, 10 Sisson Place, on North Campus;
 Group House X, occupied by University Residence Life, 201 Thurston Avenue, and formerly possessed by Lambda Upsilon Lambda, signatory since 1965, when the CURP program was closed out in favor of a return to individual leasing.

Chapters with University-owned facilities under other agreements
The Cornell University Residence Plan of 1966 was based on agreements with other institutions, dating from 1933 to 1952, and after 1965:
 Kappa Alpha Theta, 519 Stewart Ave
 Psi Upsilon, 2 Forest Park Ln
 Sigma Phi, 1 Forest Park Ln
 Kappa Sigma, 600 University Avenue
 Lambda Upsilon Lambda, 722 University Avenue
 Phi Gamma Delta ("The Oaks"), 118 McGraw Pl
 Sigma Alpha Mu, subleased from Sigma Alpha Epsilon ("Hillcrest"), 122 McGraw Pl
 Sigma Phi Epsilon, 109 McGraw Pl

Chapters with privately owned facilities
Many fraternities and sororities have remained outside the ambit of University ownership. , these chapters include the following:

 Acacia (“Northcote”), 318 Highland Rd
 Alpha Chi Omega, 210 Thurston Ave
 Alpha Delta Phi, 777 Stewart Ave
 Alpha Epsilon Phi, 435 Wyckoff Rd
 Alpha Epsilon Pi (“Thurston Manor”), 140 Thurston Ave
 Alpha Gamma Rho, 203 Highland Ave
 Alpha Phi, 411 Thurston Ave
 Alpha Sigma Phi (“Rockledge”), 804 Stewart Ave
 Alpha Tau Omega, 625 University Ave
 Alpha Xi Delta, 40 Ridgewood Rd
 Alpha Zeta, 214 Thurston Ave
 Beta Theta Pi (“Castle on the Rock”), 100 Ridgewood Rd
 Chi Psi, 810 University Ave
 Delta Chi (“The Knoll”), 102 The Knoll
 Delta Delta Delta, 118 Triphammer Rd
 Delta Gamma, 117 Triphammer Rd
 Delta Phi (“Llenroc”), 100 Cornell Ave
 Kappa Alpha Theta, 519 Stewart Ave
 Kappa Delta, 109 Triphammer Rd
 Kappa Delta Rho, 312 Highland Rd
 Kappa Kappa Gamma, 508 Thurston Ave
 Lambda Chi Alpha (“Edgemoor”), 125 Edgemoor Ln
 Phi Delta Theta, 2 Ridgewood Rd
 Phi Kappa Tau, 106 The Knoll
 Phi Mu, 509 Wyckoff Rd
 Phi Sigma Kappa, 702 University Ave
 Pi Beta Phi, 330 Triphammer Rd
 Pi Kappa Alpha, 17 South Ave
 Seal and Serpent, 305 Thurston Ave
 Sigma Chi (“Greystone”), 106 Cayuga Heights Rd
 Sigma Delta Tau, 115 Ridgewood Rd
 Sigma Nu, 230 Willard Wy
 Sigma Pi, 730 University Ave
 Tau Kappa Epsilon (“Westbourne Manor”), 105 Westbourne Ln
 Theta Delta Chi, 800 University Ave
 Zeta Beta Tau, 1 Edgecliff Pl

References

External links
 Links to informational pages about all of the fraternities & sororities at Cornell
 Fraternity & Sorority Life at Cornell University.
 Map of Fraternities and Sororities of Cornell

Fraternities and sororities
Cornell University